Cabela's Dangerous Hunts 2 is a 2005 hunting video game published by Sand Grain Studios and Cabela's. It is a sequel to the 2003 game Cabela's Dangerous Hunts.

Gameplay
As opposed to previous games, Cabela's Dangerous Hunts 2 is more focused on survival rather than hunting. The player takes the role of a famous hunter traveling through many different types of terrain, trying to find out who or what killed his best friend. As with the first game, the hunter has a limited amount of energy and can be injured, which results in failure. There are many weapons, including handguns, rifles, shotguns, knives and machetes. The game also includes many different animals including a boss, the Yeti. Unlike the first game, this one has only the story mode. During the plot, you're supposed to shoot all 80 stumps in order to unlock a "surprise," which has never really been identified by players, even after completing the difficult task.

Plot
The game begins in Alaska, where a hunter (the nameless player character) meets a man named Hugh Andrews. Hugh is a native with a glass eye and a wooden leg. He has important information about the player's old friend, "Bullseye" Bill Lewis. The player practices and then hunts whitetail deer, progressing to fight a cougar and a grizzly bear to complete the first level. The next level takes place elsewhere in Alaska, where the hunter fights his way through wolves and another mountain lion to rescue Hugh's niece and nephew. In the next, the hunter fights wolves, a grizzly bear and another mountain lion to reach a ridge and rescue Hugh Andrews, the hunter's guide, dodging bear traps to reach him. At the beginning of the next level, the hunter fights his way back to the bear cave and then meets Hugh's niece and nephew. He must bait the grizzly with  Boar meat and kill it.

The hunter then progresses to Africa seeking the legendary big game hunter "Bullseye" Bill Lewis, where the hunter crash lands with the player's pilot, Abby Pendleton, in the bush and must find shelter fighting hyenas. The hunter and guide run into a leopard pair, kill them, and then head to a nearby shelter.  Then the hunter must hike to a radio tower to send an SOS fighting leopards, cobras and crocodiles and crossing quicksand. After the SOS has been sent, lions attack Abby.. The hunter kills the alpha male and two more lions to complete the level. In the next, the hunter discovers that the man he came to Africa to see has left to find his wife, who is lost somewhere in the bush. Because it is Holy Land, and because gunfire already makes the animals mad, the hunter can only use a bow and arrow. The player fights lions from the back of a truck until the tribe leader can drive no further. The player then proceeds on foot and kill a hippopotamus and hunting the herd Thomson's gazelles and more lions to reach the wife of Hamisi, who agrees to take the hunter to a poachers nearby camp, led by a former partner Dimitri Benedik, and states that he was with 'Bullseye" when the incident happened but cannot remember much about it. In a cutscene a poacher frightens some elephants by firing a shotgun. The hunter has to tranquilize them from the back of a truck before they get to Hamisi's village. Once the player reaches the village, the level comes to an end.

The next stage takes place in India and involves tranquilizing tigers, dodging cages, and an Asian black bear with Reginald Dowling, who serves as the player's guide for the remainder of the game. After a cutscene, Reginald is told to get back to the Wilderness Rescue campsite, where another bear is on the rampage and must be tranquilized before it kills someone else. Progressing to the next level, the hunter must rescue a child, fighting tigers, avoiding cobras, bees, and cages. After finding the child, the hunter encounters an Indian rhinoceros and must tranquilize it.

The action now moves to Australia, where the hunter meets Wirake, a native aboriginal. He can only speak in beeps, pops, clicks and whistles, but tells the hunter and Reginald that some of his tribesmen are lost in the bush. The player faces two scrub bulls at a river, as well as two crocodiles, having to either kill one and leave the other or get eaten alive by both of them. The hunter then rescues the tribesmen, and the remainder of the level consists of dodging crocodile attacks and stampeding buffalo. Next, the player moves to another part of Australia. The hunter and Reginald are lost after falling into a cave. The player begins the level without a weapon, but after a short cutscene a knife is obtained. This mission consists of fighting off dingoes while escaping the cave. With the new guide, Wirake, the hunter fights fight pumas and wild boars to escape from some Argentinian ruins. After some time, Wirake notes that Reginald has disappeared. He had been chased off by a puma, and the player must rescue him. After finding Reginald trying to fend off the puma with a stick, the hunter kills it and the level ends.

Progressing to Siberia, the player snipes boars from a helicopter and then on foot, after Reginald realizes he brought the wrong ammo. The player then must travel to a nearby depot, and on the way runs into and kills Hogzilla, a giant wild boar. The hunter travels with Wirake and Reginald to fight wolves, polar bears, and a final group of boars. After that, the player meets up with Benedek and his poachers. In further cutscenes, the hunter fights Big Grimm, a Giant Male polar bear, and then a Yeti.

The game ends after a cutscene showing Reginald and Wirake congratulating the hunter on bringing down the beast that killed Bullseye. Just when Reginald thinks they can finally have a vacation, he gets a call from Wilderness Rescue about an anaconda attack.

Reception

The game received "mixed or average reviews" on all platforms according to video game review aggregator Metacritic.

References

External links

2005 video games
Action video games
Activision games
Cabela's video games
GameCube games
PlayStation 2 games
Video games developed in Romania
Video games set in Africa
Video games set in Argentina
Video games set in Asia
Video games set in Australia
Video games set in India
Video games set in North America
Video games set in Russia
Video games set in South America
Video games set in Tanzania
Video games set in Alaska
Windows games
Xbox games
Fun Labs games
Single-player video games
Sand Grain Studios games
Magic Wand Productions games